Sucre Canton is a canton of Ecuador, located in the Manabí Province.  Its capital is the city of Bahía de Caráquez.  Its population at the 2001 census was 52,158. The canton owes its name to Marshal Antonio José de Sucre.

Extension and limits 
Sucre has an area of 764 km² and its limits are:

To the North with the Canton of San Vicente.
To the south with the cantons of Portoviejo and Rocafuerte.
To the east with the cantons Tosagua and Rocafuerte.
To the west with the Pacific Ocean.
The parish of San Isidro is separated from the rest of the canton by the canton of San Vicente.

Political Division 
Sucre is divided into four parishes:

Urban Parishes
Bay of Caráquez
Leonidas Plaza Gutiérrez
Rural Parishes
Charapotó
San Isidro

Demographics
Ethnic groups as of the Ecuadorian census of 2010:
Mestizo  78.8%
Montubio  9.2%
Afro-Ecuadorian  7.0%
White  4.5%
Indigenous  0.1%
Other  0.4%

References

See also 
Antonio José de Sucre
Sucre, Manabí

Cantons of Manabí Province